Ramopia  is a genus of moths of the family Erebidae. The genus was described by Nye in 1975.

The Global Lepidoptera Names Index gives this name as a synonym of Rejectaria Guenée, 1854.

Species
Ramopia nigripunctata (Schaus, 1913) Costa Rica
Ramopia rufifusalis (Hampson, 1924) Trinidad

References

Herminiinae